Macrocheilus biplagiatus is a species of ground beetle in the subfamily Anthiinae. It was described by Boheman in 1848.

References

Anthiinae (beetle)
Beetles described in 1848